Te-Shawn Alleyne (born 8 October 1999) is a Trinidadian cricketer. He made his List A debut for the West Indies Under-19s in the 2016–17 Regional Super50 on 25 January 2017.

References

External links
 

1999 births
Living people
West Indies under-19 cricketers
Place of birth missing (living people)